Helton Dos Reis (born 1 May 1988 in Lyon) is a French footballer of Cap-Verdian descent who most recently played as a defender for Jeddah.

Career
Helton began his career with Gueugnon. In June 2008, he joined Ligue 1 side Saint-Étienne and was immediately loaned out to RM Hamm Benfica in Luxembourg. After his return in Saint-Etienne, he played mainly for their B team. Helton made his Ligue 1 debut on 7 November 2009 in a 1–0 win over Nancy at Stade Marcel Picot, coming off the bench to replace Cédric Varrault on the 16th minute of the match.

On 4 August 2010, Helton signed for Grenoble Foot 38 on a free transfer. Two days later, he scored the only goal in Grenoble's 1–0 victory over Le Havre. He made 29 appearances for the club in Ligue 2. After one season at Grenoble, Helton joined Cypriot First Division side Apollon Limassol. He remained in Cyprus for four months, and moved on to Lyon-Duchère in 2012.

On 12 September 2013, after a successful trial period, Helton signed a contract with Bulgarian club Lokomotiv Sofia. He performed well for Lokomotiv through the years, cementing a place as a right-back in the first-team. Helton scored on his Bulgarian A Group debut on 21 September, in a 2–2 draw against Cherno More Varna at Ticha Stadium. He made 53 league appearances and scored two league goals for Lokomotiv.

On 26 August 2015, Helton signed for Litex Lovech on a free transfer. Three days later, he was one of Litex's unused substitutes in their 1–0 league loss against Beroe Stara Zagora. On 30 August, he played full 90 minutes for Litex II in a B Group match against Ludogorets II. On 12 September, Helton made his debut for Litex in the 2–0 away win against Botev Plovdiv, playing at centre-back alongside Rafael Pérez instead of his usual right-back position.

On 27 July 2017 he returned in Bulgaria, after a time spend in the China club Shenzhen, to sign with the newly promoted to the top division team of Septemvri Sofia, led by his ex manager in Lokomotiv Sofia.

References

External links

1988 births
Living people
Footballers from Lyon
French sportspeople of Cape Verdean descent
French footballers
FC Gueugnon players
AS Saint-Étienne players
FC RM Hamm Benfica players
Grenoble Foot 38 players
Apollon Limassol FC players
Lyon La Duchère players
FC Lokomotiv 1929 Sofia players
PFC Litex Lovech players
Shenzhen F.C. players
FC Septemvri Sofia players
FC Ordabasy players
Jeddah Club players
Ligue 1 players
Ligue 2 players
Luxembourg National Division players
Cypriot First Division players
First Professional Football League (Bulgaria) players
Second Professional Football League (Bulgaria) players
China League One players
Saudi First Division League players
Association football defenders
French expatriate footballers
French expatriate sportspeople in Luxembourg
French expatriate sportspeople in Cyprus
French expatriate sportspeople in Bulgaria
French expatriate sportspeople in China
French expatriate sportspeople in Saudi Arabia
Expatriate footballers in Luxembourg
Expatriate footballers in Cyprus
Expatriate footballers in Bulgaria
Expatriate footballers in China
Expatriate footballers in Saudi Arabia